Cockshutt may refer to:
 Cockshutt, Shropshire, a village and civil parish in the United Kingdom
 Cockshutt, an area of Highley village, Shropshire, United Kingdom
 Ignatius Cockshutt, Canadian businessman
 Cockshutt Plow Company, a Canadian company
 Henry Cockshutt, Lieutenant-Governor of Ontario and another son of Ignatius
 William Foster Cockshutt, Canadian politician and another son of Ignatius

See also 

 Cockshoot or cockshut, a broad opening in a forest